Mituva is a river in the western part of Lithuania (Raseiniai and Jurbarkas districts). It is a tributary of the Nemunas River. The Mituva originates 8 km to the northwest of Ariogala and just 1 km from the Dubysa river. It flows to the west and after confluence with the Vidauja river turns to the southeast. The Mituva joins with the Nemunas in Jurbarkas City.

The main tributaries are Gausantė, Snietala, Antvardė, Imsrė, Akmena, Alsa and Vidauja.

Rivers of Lithuania